Zhou Xuexi (January 12, 1866 in Jinling – September 26, 1947 in Beijing) was an industrialist of northern China who served as the Minister of Finance for the Republic of China from July 1912 to May 1913, and from January 1915 to March 1916. He was closely associated with Yuan Shikai and by Yuan's death in 1916 Zhou was the most important financier and industrialist in northern China.

He founded and/or led the following institutions/companies:

1901, Shandong University
1903, Hebei University of Technology
Beiyang Bureau of Industry
Kaiping Mines - merged with Luanzhou in 1912, renamed Kailuan
1906, Chee Hsin (Qixin) Cement Co.
1907, Luanzhou Mining
Tientsin Official Bank
 1908 Jingshi Water Works (now Beijing Water Works)
1916, Hua Hsin (Wah Hsing; Hua Xing) Cotton Spinning and Weaving Co.
1919, National Industrial Bank of China
1921, Pu Yu Machinery Co.
1923, Hua Hsin Bank

Zhou Xuexi was the fourth son of Zhou Fu.

References 

1866 births
1947 deaths
Republic of China politicians from Jiangsu
Businesspeople from Nanjing
Finance Ministers of the Republic of China
Presidents of Shandong University